Pol Borideh (also Romanized as Pol Borīdeh; also known as Pol Borīdeh-e Pā’īn, Pol Borīdeh Pā’īn, and Pol Borīdeh-ye Soflá) is a village in Manj Rural District, Manj District, Lordegan County, Chaharmahal and Bakhtiari Province, Iran. At the 2006 census, its population was 904, in 171 families. The village is populated by Lurs.

References 

Populated places in Lordegan County
Luri settlements in Chaharmahal and Bakhtiari Province